The Asturias autonomous football team is the regional football team for Asturias. They are not affiliated with FIFA or UEFA, because it is represented internationally by the Spain national football team. The team only plays friendlies.

History

Cantabric Federation
The Regional Cantabric Federation of Football Clubs was founded on 9 December 1915 with the aim to represent all the clubs in the Province of Oviedo. On 22 November 1916, the Spanish Football Federation allowed the clubs of Cantabria to leave the Northern Regional Championship and join the newly created Cantabrian Regional Federation, along with clubs from Oviedo, soon to be renamed Asturias.

In 1917, the Cantabrians joined forces with the Asturian clubs, and as the 'Cantabric Team', they played four official matches between 1917 and 1918, competing in the defunct Copa Príncipe de Asturias, an inter-regional competition organized by the Spanish Federation. This Cantabric side had the likes of the Villaverde brothers (Fernando and Senén), Manuel Argüelles and Manuel Meana, with the latter two going on to represent the Asturias national team in the 1920s.

Asturian Federation
On 28 May 1918, the Cantabrian clubs returned to the Northern Federation, so the Spanish Federation agreed to change the name of the Cantabric Federation to Regional Asturian Federation of Football Clubs. Their first game as the Asturias autonomous football team was a friendly against St Mirren F.C. which ended in a 3–7 loss, with the Asturian goalscorers being José Luis Zabala, Manuel Argüelles and Domingo. The Regional Asturian team then played seven official games between 1922 and 1926 in the Prince of Asturias Cup, winning the 1922–23 edition, largely thanks to their main player Zabala, who scored twice in their thrilling 4-3 extra-time win over Biscay in the quarter-finals, followed by a last-minute winner against Catalonia in the semi-finals and to seal the title in style, a second-half brace in the final to give his side a 3-1 win over Galicia, with the Asturian equaliser coming from Manuel Meana. The following edition wasn't so successful as they were knocked out by Biscay in the quarter-finals despite yet another Zabala goal. The last edition of the competition was a two-legged final between the winners of the previous two, Asturias and Catalonia, facing each other only for the right to keep the trophy, and Catalonia won both games (2–0 and 4–3), thus deeming Asturias to a silver medal, with the silver lining being a late brace in two minutes from Ramón Herrera. The year before, in 1925, they had faced Cantabria in another two-legged affair, at El Sardinero in Santander and at the El Molinón in Gijón, and after a 3–3 draw away, they lost 0–1 at home thanks to an own goal from what had been a Cantabric international in 1918: Manuel Meana. During the 1930s, the Asturian team continued playing several friendly games until the Spanish Civil War.

Revival in the 2000s
On 23 December 2000, the Royal Asturian Football Federation rescued the Regional team to play a friendly game at Estadio Carlos Tartiere against Macedonia. Juanele scored the only goal of the match, with 30,000 people filling the stadium in Oviedo. Asturias played two more games, against Lithuania in Gijón and Honduras in Avilés, ending its revival unbeaten.

In December 2008, a friendly game against Sporting de Gijón legends was going to be organized, but in the end, it was canceled.

Competitive record

Results

Cantabric

Notes

Asturias

Statistics since 2000

Head to head against other Autonomous Communities

Selected former coaches
 José Manuel Díaz Novoa (2000–2002)
 Marcelino García Toral

Honours
Prince of Asturias Cup:
Champions (1): 1922–23
Runners-up (2): 1918 and 1926

Notable players

Amateur team (UEFA Regions' Cup)

Women's team
The women's team made its debut on 19 May 2019 in Santa Cruz de Bezana, Cantabria. They were defeated 2–3 by Cantabria.

See also
:Category:Footballers from Asturias

References

External links
List of matches in Roon Ba
Matches of Catalonia at Copa Príncipe de Asturias

Autonomous football team
Asturias
Representative teams of association football leagues
Sports organizations established in 1922
1922 establishments in Spain